The Well is a jazz album by pianist Tord Gustavsen and his quartet. Recorded in February 2011, it was released by ECM Records on January 27, 2012 as ECM 2237.

Reception 
The Allmusic review by Thom Jurek awarded the album 4 stars stating: The title cut, the other pillar of this album, commences with a mysterious, nearly floating lyric figure stated on piano and answered by Brunborg's warm, welcoming tenor before it enters the realm of something approaching drift. That said, the focus on melody is quietly intense, even as the track becomes more abstract toward the middle; bass, piano, and saxophone all trade fours in rotation, answering and questioning further. Brunborg even moves toward blues in his solo. Playing quietly does require tremendous energy and discipline, and often runs counter to the improviser's instincts.

Track listing 
All compositions by Tord Gustavsen.

"Prelude" (2:51)
"Playing" (5:38)
"Suite" (8:22)
"Communion" (4:36)
"Circling" (4:42)
"Glasgow Intro" (1:13)
"On Every Corner" (5:14)
"The Well" (5:50)
"Communion, Var." (5:58)
"Intuition" (4:33)
"Inside" (4:16)

Personnel 
Tord Gustavsen – piano
Tore Brunborg – tenor saxophone
Mats Eilertsen – double bass
Jarle Vespestad – drums
Manfred Eicher – production

References 

ECM Records albums
2012 albums
Albums produced by Manfred Eicher
Tord Gustavsen albums